Francesco Antonio Santorio (died 1589) was a Roman Catholic prelate who served as Archbishop of Acerenza e Matera (1586–1589) and Archbishop of Santa Severina (1573–1586).

Biography
On 9 January 1573, Francesco Antonio Santorio was appointed during the papacy of Pope Gregory XIII as Archbishop of Santa Severina. 
In March 1573, he was consecrated bishop by Giulio Antonio Santorio, Cardinal-Priest of San Bartolomeo all'Isola. 
On 28 July 1586, he was appointed during the papacy of Pope Sixtus V as Archbishop of Acerenza e Matera. 
He served as Archbishop of Acerenza e Matera until his death in 1589.

References

External links and additional sources
 (for Chronology of Bishops) 
 (for Chronology of Bishops)  
 (for Chronology of Bishops) 
 (for Chronology of Bishops 

16th-century Italian Roman Catholic archbishops
Bishops appointed by Pope Gregory XIII
Bishops appointed by Pope Sixtus V
1589 deaths